Bret is the surname of:

 Antoine Bret (1717–1792), French writer and playwright
 David Bret (born 1954), French-born British author of biographies
 Jean Jacques Bret (1781–1819), French mathematician
 Patrice Bret (ski mountaineer) (born 1971), French ski mountaineer
 Patrice Bret (historian) (born 1949), French historian of science and technology

See also
 Lebret (disambiguation)